Boris Lehman (born 3 March 1944, Lausanne), is a Belgian author-filmmaker of experimental cinema. 

Lehman initially studied piano, but in the early 1960s became interested in photography and cinema. In 1966, after graduating in Film Studies from the Institut National Supérieur des Arts du spectacle, Brussels, he became a film enthusiast and critic, contributing reviews to weekly publications and magazines. He began making films between 1965 and 1983 when working for Club Antonin Artaud, a readjustment day centre for the mentally ill, using cinema as a therapeutic tool with patients. He later founded the film-based  organisations Cinélibre, Cinédit, and AJC, the young filmmakers' workshop.

He has assisted Henri Storck with the films Secret Forest of Africa and Fêtes de Belgique, and Chantal Akerman with Jeanne Dielman. He has also collaborated with filmmakers Patrick Van Antwerpen, Jean-Marie Buchet and Gérard Courant. As an actor, Lehman has played roles in Brussels-transit (dir. Samy Szlingerbaum 1980), Canal K (dir. Maurice Rabinowicz 1970), and Les Filles en Orange (dir. Yaël André 2003).

Initially working with amateurs, he has produced 400 films in Super 8, 16 mm or video, as either shorts, features, documentaries, journals or autobiographies, and has shot 300,000 photographs. He wrote the libretto of Fanny Tran's opera ″ La véritable histoire de la Dame Blanche"(2020). Lehman's cinematic work has little public recognition but has been shown at numerous festivals and cine clubs.

Films
La Clé du champ, 1963
Histoire d'un déménagement, 1967
Catalogue, 1968
Le Centre et la Classe, 1970
Ne pas Stagner, 1973
Knokke Out, 1974
Album 1, 1974
Magnum Begynasium Bruxellense, 1978
Symphonie, 1979
Couple, Regards, Positions, 1983
Portrait du peintre dans son atelier, 1985
Muet comme une carpe, 1987
Masque, 1987
L'Homme de Terre, 1989
Cinématon (juif) de Gérard Courant, 1989
A la recherche du lieu de ma naissance, 1990
La Chute des Heures, 1990
Babel / Lettre à mes amis restés en Belgique, 1991
Tentatives de se décrire, 1989-2005
Je suis fier d'être Belge, 1993
Leçon de vie, 1994
Homme portant son film le plus lourd, 1994
La Division de mon temps, 1994
Un jour comme les autres,  1994
Check-Up (Etat de Santé), 1994
Un Bruit qui rend sourd, 1995
La Dernière s(cène),  1995
Mes Entretiens filmés,  1996
Mon voyage en Allemagne, 1997
Mon voyage à Moscou, 1997
L‘image et le monde, 1998
A comme Adrienne, 2000
Histoire de ma vie racontée par mes photographies, 2001
Mes 7 lieux, 2001
Homme portant, 2003

References

External links
Official Web site
Institut National Supérieur des Arts du spectacle. Retrieved 2 April 2011
Club Antonin Artaud. Retrieved 2 April 2011

Belgian film directors
1944 births
Living people
Belgian experimental filmmakers
People from Lausanne